Fulvio Fantoni (born 9 November 1963) is an Italian international bridge player. He is a six-time world champion, a World Grand Master of the World Bridge Federation (WBF), and the WBF first-ranked player as of December 2011. He is one of 10 players who have won the Triple Crown of Bridge.

Fantoni was born in Grosseto. November 1963, Fantoni says that he has lived "practically since I was born" in Ostia, in the coastal district of Rome. His regular partner for many years is Claudio Nunes, the second-ranked World Grand Master (April 2011). Nunes also lives in Ostia and they see each other socially.

They play "Fantunes", for their surnames, an innovative bidding system characterised by natural but forcing one-level opening bids in all four suits. The pair was implicated in a cheating scandal in 2015 resulting in sanctions against them, only some of which were negated by appeals.

Emigration to Monaco

Since 2011 Fantoni and Nunes are full-time members of a team led and paid by the Swiss real-estate tycoon Pierre Zimmermann, under contract expiring 2016. From 2012 all six members would be residents of Monaco and the team would represent Monaco internationally. The team finished third in the 2010 world championship, not yet full-time, and competed in the 2011 European Bridge League open championship (neither is a national teams event). In the 2012 the team won the European Team Championship and got the second place in the 2014. They were also runner up in Bermuda Bowl 2013 in Bali.

Cheating scandal

In September 2015, Fantoni and Nunes were publicly accused of cheating by orienting a played card to show a missing high honour (Ace, King, Queen) in the led suit at the European Bridge Championship in 2014. Three separate investigations were conducted and they were found guilty.
 On March 19, 2016, the FIGB banned the pair for three years.
 On July 18, 2016, the European Bridge League (EBL) banned each from play for five years and as a partnership for life.
 On July 26, 2016, the American Contract Bridge League (ACBL) expelled them from their league and stripped them of all related masterpoints, titles, ranks and privileges.
 On January 10, 2018, the players' appeal to the Court of Arbitration for Sport resulted in a judgement in their favour. It found that:

 On July 15, 2018, the FIGB's Federal Appellate Court reversed its own decision and all sanctions were canceled.
Only the ACBL sanction remains in place; all others have been overturned.

Subsequent controversy 
In the 2021 European championships, Italy included Fantoni on its team. In protest, the remaining national teams refused to play against the Italians and subsequently forfeited their games. Several national bridge associations indicated support for the forfeitures.

Major tournament wins

 Bermuda Bowl: 2005
 World Team Olympiad: 2004
 World Mind Sports Games: Open Teams 2008 — successor to the quadrennial Olympiad
 World Transnational Open Teams Championship: 2007
 World Open Pairs: 2002
 World Mixed Pairs: 2010
 European Teams Championships: 2004, 2006, 2012
 European Champions' Cup for Open Teams: 2003, 2004, 2005, 2007, 2008, 2009
 North American Bridge Championships (11)
 Wernher Open Pairs (1) 2004 
 Blue Ribbon Pairs (1) 2006 
 Jacoby Open Swiss Teams (1) 2003 
 Mitchell Board-a-Match Teams (1) 2004 
 Chicago Mixed Board-a-Match (1) 2003 
 Reisinger (3) 2007, 2012, 2013 
 Roth Open Swiss Teams (1) 2005 
 Spingold (2) 2011, 2012

Runners-up

 Bermuda Bowl (3) 2003, 2009, 2013 
 Cavendish Invitational Pairs (1) 2004 
 Buffett Cup (2) 2010, 2012
 North American Bridge Championships (6)
 Jacoby Open Swiss Teams (1) 2004 
 Vanderbilt (1) 2014 
 Reisinger (1) 2011 
 Spingold (3) 2006, 2010, 2014

References

External links
 Bridge Winners profile (maintained by Fantoni)
 
 
 Biography at Infobridge.it (Italian with crude English-language version)

1963 births
Italian contract bridge players
Monegasque contract bridge players
People of Lazian descent
Bermuda Bowl players
People from Grosseto
Sportspeople from Rome
Italian emigrants to Monaco
Living people